The Junkers A 32 was a mail plane built in prototype form in Germany in the late 1920s, and later developed as a prototype reconnaissance-bomber under the designation K 39. The design was a conventional low-wing cantilever monoplane with fixed tailskid undercarriage. Construction was metal throughout, with corrugated duralumin skin. Three open cockpits were provided in tandem; the third seat intended from the outset to accommodate a tail gunner for a military version of the aircraft. In fact, the militarised version developed in Sweden by AB Flygindustri featured a fourth crew position as well, for a bombardier. This version featured twin machine guns built into the engine cowling, and a trainable machine gun for the tail gunner.

Only two A 32s were built, and the first prototype was destroyed in a crash on 2 November 1927 that killed Junkers engineer Karl Plauth. The sole K 39 constructed may have been modified from the second prototype. No sales of either the civil or military version ensued.

Specifications (K 39)

References

 
 The Hugo Junkers Homepage
 Уголок неба

1920s German mailplanes
A 32
Low-wing aircraft
Aircraft first flown in 1926